Eumelio Ramón Palacios Cristaldo (born 15 September 1964 in Asunción, Paraguay) is a former striker and football coach.

References 

1964 births
Living people
Paraguayan footballers
Paraguay international footballers
Club Libertad footballers
Club Guaraní players
Association football forwards